British Championships or British Championship may refer to:

 The Amateur Championship (sometimes referred to as the British Amateur or British Amateur Championship outside of the UK) (golf)
 BMW PGA Championship (originally called the British PGA Championship) (golf)
 BRDC Sportscar Championship (sometimes referred to as the British C2 Championship) (sports car racing)
 British Athletics Championships
 British Championship (ice hockey)
 British Chess Championship
 British Drift Championship
 British Figure Skating Championships
 British Firework Championships
 British Flyweight Championship (professional wrestling)
 British Formula Three Championship
 British GT Championship
 British Heavyweight Championship (professional wrestling)
 British Heavyweight Championship (XWA) (professional wrestling)
 British Hill Climb Championship
 British Home Championship (football)
 British Lightweight Championship (professional wrestling)
 British Motocross Championship
 British Open Championship Golf (video game)
 British Professional Championship (darts)
 British Quizzing Championships
 British Rally Championship
 British Rallycross Championship
 British Riders' Championship (motocycle speedway)
 British Roller Derby Championships
 British Rowing Championships
 British Speedway Championship
 British Superbike Championship Support Series
 British Supersport Championship
 British Touring Car Championship
 British Welterweight Championship (professional wrestling)
 EFL Championship (a league of the English Football League)
 Mobil 1 Rally Championship (officially called Mobil 1 British Rally Championship) (video game)
 The Open Championship (often referred to as the British Open) (golf)
 RBW British Middleweight Championship (professional wrestling)
 Senior Open Championship (originally known as the Senior British Open) (golf)
 Triple Crown Tournament (cricket)

 British POG championship (1996-2005)

Bike
British National Hill Climb Championships
British National Road Race Championships
British National Track Championships
British National Madison Championships
British National Cyclo-cross Championships
British National Derny Championships

See also
 UK Championship (disambiguation)